Wong Jinglun (born 23 July 1983) is a Taiwan-based Singaporean singer and actor. He is managed by Universes Entertainment Marketing Limited.

Biography
Wong is of Hakka descent, with ancestry from Dabu, Guangdong. He was a contestant on season 3 of One Million Star. He auditioned in Singapore and was one of the five contestants to get the golden ticket to compete in Taiwan. He once PKed with Peter Pan when "Four Princes of Superstar Avenue" went to Singapore. He caught the attention of many people because of his high pitched vocals and falsettos, which sounds like a hybrid of mainly Gilla, a bit of Cher, and Patti Page. He is also well known for his humorous character and speech. He never fails to say Chinese idioms in every week's competition. Wong gotten a sixth position in the competition and was voted as the most popular contestant. He performed five songs in a One Million Star concert show in LA. His performance was highly commended by many.

Wong's debut album, Jing's Note, was released in Taiwan on 14 November 2008. His album sold over 45,000 copies in Taiwan and around 4,000 copies in Singapore.

Wong is attending vocal and acting classes in Taiwan. He was the guest artists for most of Jolin Tsai's Butterfly School Concert Tour. He has also clinched his first endorsement deal with Suntory C.C. Lemon alongside his fellow senior Rainie Yang.

In 2009, Wong co-starred with Cyndi Wang and Jiro Wang in his first Taiwanese drama, Momo Love on Gala Television (GTV). Prior to that, he had a small role on SET's My Queen as Ethan Juan's classmate.

From 2011, Wong shifted his focus on TV presenting (referred as a variety-show-class entertainer). He, along with Sister Strawberry, took over from Linda Jian (Sister Butterfly) and Hank Chen in November 2012 on a travel show.

In 2013, Wong starred in an original musical by Toy Factory Productions, entitled Innamorati, which features 12 songs sung by Eric Moo, along with 6 other singers including Tay Kewei, Bonnie Loo and Sugie Phua.

Personal life 
Wong was married in May 2020 and his son born on 24 September 2020.

Discography

Albums

Soundtrack contribution
 "我的媽" [My Mother] – insert song for Momo Love
 "鹹魚" [Salted Fish] – insert song for Momo Love

Filmography

Television series

Stage productions

Endorsements
2009: Suntory C.C.Lemon

References

External links
  Universes Entertainment Marketing Ltd Jinglun's official profile
  'I Love Super' Mars Entertainment Blogs Jinglun's official blog (June 2009–present)
  Wong JingLun's blog (April 2008 – June 2009)
  Warner Music Taiwan

Singaporean people of Hakka descent
People from Dabu
Singaporean Mandopop singers
21st-century Singaporean male singers
1983 births
Living people
One Million Star contestants
Hakka musicians